Roberta is a musical from 1933 with music by Jerome Kern, and lyrics and book by Otto Harbach. The musical is based on the novel Gowns by Roberta by Alice Duer Miller. It features the songs "Yesterdays", "Smoke Gets in Your Eyes", "Let's Begin", "You're Devastating", "Something Had To Happen", "The Touch of Your Hand" and "I'll Be Hard to Handle".

Productions
The original Broadway production opened at the New Amsterdam Theatre on November 18, 1933, and ran for 295 performances closing on 21 July 1934. It starred Tamara Drasin (billed as Tamara), Bob Hope, George Murphy, Lyda Roberti, Fred MacMurray, Fay Templeton, Ray Middleton (billed as Raymond E. Middleton), Allan Jones, and Sydney Greenstreet. Hope, Murphy, MacMurray and Greenstreet were not yet the Hollywood stars they would soon be, and Middleton was not the Broadway leading man he would become after Annie Get Your Gun.

An Australian production opened at His Majesty's Theatre in Melbourne on December 22, 1934. The cast featured Madge Elliot and Cyril Richard.

Original Broadway cast

 Bob Hope as Huckleberry Haines
 Tamara Drasin as Princess Stephanie
 Ray Middleton as John Kent
 Fay Templeton as Aunt Minnie / Roberta
 George Murphy as Billy Boyden
 Lyda Roberti as Madame Nunez / Clementina Scharwenka
 Sydney Greenstreet as Lord Henry Delves
 Fred MacMurray as California Collegian
 Allan Jones as California Collegian
 Helen Gray as Sophie Teale
 Jane Evans as Mrs. Teale
 Bobette Christine as Angele
 William Hain as Ladislaw
 Nayan Pearce as Luella Laverne
 Mavis Walsh as Marie
 Ed Jerome as Monsieur Leroux
 Berenice Alaire as Sidonie
 Gretchen Sherman as The Buyer
 Virginia Whitmore as The Flower Girl

Other versions
The play was made into a 1935 film by RKO starring Irene Dunne, Fred Astaire, Ginger Rogers, and Randolph Scott. The film omitted "The Touch of Your Hand" (sung by a minor character), "Something Had To Happen", and "You're Devastating" (originally Middleton's big song in the show), but added the Kern songs "I Won't Dance" (lifted from the flop Kern show Three Sisters) and "Lovely to Look At" (written for the 1935 film and nominated for an Academy Award). These two  additions became so popular that they are now frequently included in revivals and recordings of Roberta.

A radio adaptation of Roberta was presented on Philip Morris Playhouse on CBS May 14, 1943. Mary Martin and William Gargan starred in the program.

In 1952, MGM remade Roberta under the title Lovely to Look At. This remake also included the two songs added to the 1935 film. It starred Kathryn Grayson, Howard Keel, Red Skelton, Ann Miller, Gower Champion, Marge Champion, and Zsa Zsa Gabor, was made in Technicolor and reuniting four members of the previous year's Show Boat (Grayson, Keel and the two Champions).

In 1958, it was made into a made-for-TV-movie starring Bob Hope, Anna Maria Alberghetti, Howard Keel and Janis Paige.

The show was also presented on television in a highly adapted, modernized 1969 NBC color telecast. This production was presented by Bob Hope, who reprised his original stage role, inserting many new, then-topical jokes about current events. Others in the cast included Michele Lee, John Davidson, Eve McVeagh, and Janis Paige (who sang "I Won't Dance" with a male chorus).

In 2014, New World Records released a complete recording of the score, reconstructed by Larry Moore, with Rob Berman conducting the Orchestra of Ireland and a cast of American, British, and Irish performers, including Jason Graae, Annalene Beechey, Kim Criswell, Patrick Cummings, Tally Sessions, Diana Montague, Laura Daniel, Jeanne Lehman, John Molloy, and Eamonn Mulhall.

References

Sources

External links

1933 musicals
Broadway musicals
Musicals based on novels
Musicals by Jerome Kern
Musicals by Otto Harbach